The Council of Trent was held in several sessions from 1545 to 1563. The council was convoked to help the church respond to the challenge posed by the Protestant Reformation, which had begun with Martin Luther decades earlier. The council played a large part in the revitalization of the Roman Catholic Church throughout Europe.

A number of canons assigning automatic ex-communication were enacted, which became part of the church's canon law. Heresies about the Sacraments or de fide doctrines which had been rejected or re-defined by the Protestants were specified and assigned automatic excommunication for Catholics who held them. These canons still apply today, as evidenced by the fact that the contemporary Catechism of the Catholic Church cites them as authoritative on almost every page.

Original Sin
Original sin is a Catholic doctrine that teaches that all human beings are born with the taint of Adam and Eve's sin; this taint can only be removed through baptism. Some Protestants re-defined (or rejected) original sin. The following canon laws were enacted to punish heretics in the church who rejected this belief.

Justification
Justification is what a person needs to do God's will and find salvation, a prominent controversy during the Reformation. Martin Luther, John Calvin and other prominent Protestants rejected the Catholic belief that a person needs to do good works to attain salvation, teaching that faith alone is sufficient. Connected to the controversy were other Protestant ideas in some sects: it was impossible for a person not to sin, that good deeds were still sinful in God's eyes, that one could be certain that one was saved in this life, or humanity was helpless in working for its salvation. At Trent, the Catholic Church enacted the following canons to excommunicate those with the following ideas.

Sacraments 
Most Protestants rejected or redefined the sacraments during the Reformation. The Catholic Church has seven sacraments: baptism, confirmation, the Eucharist, Penance, anointing of the sick, holy orders and matrimony. The church historically taught that the sacraments, existing in physical places and circumstances, gave invisible grace to the souls of those who received them with the proper disposition and were by no means symbolic. In the Catholic Church, only a priest or bishop could administer most sacraments. Many Protestants said that the Catholic Church had introduced elements into the church which had not come from Christ. To answer this challenge of its teachings, the council enacted the following canons to punish heretics in the church who rejected its teachings on the sacraments.

Baptism
Although Martin Luther retained the Catholic form of baptism, other Protestants rejected or redefined it. Anabaptists rejected infant baptism and performed second baptisms on adults because they did not believe that infant baptism was intended by Christ. In response, the church enacted the following canons to excommunicate those who held these ideas.

Confirmation
In confirmation, a bishop anoints a person with oil and seals them with the gift of the Holy Spirit. This sacrament was rejected or redefined by a number of Protestant denominations. The following canons were enacted to punish those in the church who subscribed to any of the listed ideas.

Eucharist
The Eucharist, also known as Holy Communion or the Blessed Sacrament, is bread and wine which are consecrated during Mass and transubstantiated into the body and blood of Christ. This core Catholic belief was rejected or redefined by most Protestants. Some, such as Luther, affirmed the Real Presence of Christ in the sacrament, but rejected the doctrine of Transubstantiation as an explanation of that Presence. Others affirmed a "spiritual" presence, or rejected the presence of Christ in the bread and wine outright. The following canons were enacted at Trent to punish Catholics who subscribed to the following ideas.

Communion with both species and distribution to infants
Before the Reformation and going back to the time of Jan Hus, the church had experienced a controversy about whether bread and wine should be given to every communicant or only the bread. At that time it did not allow for the laity to receive the consecrated wine at Mass, partly due to the fear that the laity might abuse it; priests and bishops drank the consecrated wine. A century earlier, Hus rejected the church's position; the issue predated Luther, but during the Reformation the issue was raised again. Some Protestants said that the Catholic Church was not following Christ's teaching when it distributed the bread without the wine.

The church also historically gave communion to children only when they reached the age of reason, and this practice is still followed today. The Eastern Orthodox church distributed communion to infants (as it still does), and some Protestants questioned the Catholic doctrine. To answer this challenge, the church enacted the following canons to excommunicate any Catholic who subscribed to these beliefs.

Penance
In confession (also known as the sacrament of Penance or reconciliation), a person confesses their sins to a priest or bishop and receives God's forgiveness through absolution by the priest or bishop. This sacrament was criticised by many Protestants during the Reformation and abolished in many of the new Protestant denominations on the basis that a priest or bishop did not have power from God to forgive (or refuse to forgive) people's sins. To answer this challenge, the church enacted the following canons to punish Catholics who subscribed to these ideas.

Anointing of the sick
In the anointing of the sick, which is part of extreme unction or the last rites, a priest or bishop anoints a person with oil to ask God for healing, and prepare them for death in the event of a serious illness or other health-related event. Although it was almost exclusively given to those soon to die, in modern times it is frequently given to those who are seriously ill (e.g., before major surgery) to prepare them with God's help. Like other sacraments, this was challenged, rejected or redefined by many Protestants. To answer this, the church enacted the following canons to correct Catholics who subscribed to these ideas.

Holy orders
Holy orders in the Catholic Church is the sacrament which makes a baptized man a deacon, priest or bishop. The church historically believed that a person who receives this sacrament is permanently changed and given special grace by God to serve in his place as a leader of the church. It also historically believed that only a priest or bishop could perform six of the seven sacraments (baptism could be performed by anyone and holy orders required a bishop, and the other five could be administered by a priest or bishop), and this sacrament gave him the power to do so. This belief was rejected by many Protestant denominations, who said that there was no mediator between man and God other than Jesus Christ, the Bible was the sole authority for Christians, that everyone in the church was equally empowered by God to be priests and that clerical celibacy did not come from Christ. In answer, the Catholic Church enacted the following canons to punish with excommunication anyone in the church who subscribed to these ideas.

Marriage
Marriage in the Catholic Church is a sacrament believed to bestow grace on the couple who receives it. Although Protestants did not reject the idea of monogamous heterosexual marriage during the Reformation, some questioned the church's teachings about divorce (the unbreakable nature of a consummated marriage or the rejection of polygamy found in the Bible). Like the other sacraments, Protestants rejected the idea that priests or bishops had a special power to sacramentally marry. To answer this challenge, the church enacted the following canons to punish Catholics who subscribed to any of these ideas.

Mass
The Mass, in which bread and wine is consecrated to become the body and blood of Christ (as Catholics believe) and offered to God as a sacrifice, was attacked by many Protestants who said that only Christ's sacrifice on the cross was a true sacrifice and Catholics showed disrespect to (or lack of faith in) his sacrifice by believing that their mass was the equivalent. Protestants also rejected elements of the mass such as priestly vestments and the naming of saints. In response, the Catholic Church enacted the following canons to punish with excommunication those in the church who subscribed to these ideas.

Other offences
The council also recorded a number of other excommunicable offences not part of the above categories.

See also
 List of excommunicable offences in the Catholic Church

References

Council of Trent
Excommunication